Gasparo Cavalieri (1648–1690) was a Roman Catholic cardinal.

Biography
On 9 Nov 1687, he was consecrated bishop by Gasparo Carpegna, Cardinal-Priest of San Silvestro in Capite, with Francesco Casati, Titular Archbishop of Trapezus, with Prospero Bottini, Titular Archbishop of Myra, serving as co-consecrators.

References

1648 births
1690 deaths
17th-century Italian cardinals
17th-century Italian Roman Catholic bishops